Ichiki (written: 一木 or 市来) is a Japanese surname. Notable people with the surname include:

 (1892–1942), Japanese general
 (1867–1944), Japanese politician
 (born 1982), Japanese voice actor
 (1872–1954), Japanese businessman and banker
 (1828–1903), Japanese photographer

See also
, former town in Hioki District, Kagoshima Prefecture, Japan
, train station in Ichikikushikino, Kagoshima Prefecture, Japan

Japanese-language surnames